Journey into the Night is the third studio album by Taiwanese Mandopop singer-songwriter William Wei. It was released on March 25, 2014, by Linfair Records. The album consists of 11 tracks. The theme of the album is about fears and it drew inspirations from the Ang Lee's movie, Life of Pi.
 
Journey into the Night received 2 nominations at the 26th Golden Melody Awards, including 1 win. The lead single, 'Wolves' (狼) earned Wei the Best Composer award. Wei was also nominated for Best Mandarin Male Singer.

Track listing

Music videos

References

2014 albums
William Wei albums